Zakaria Hadraf (born 12 March 1990) is a Moroccan professional footballer who currently plays for Botola club Raja CA as a winger.

Club career
Hadraf started his career with Difaâ El Jadida, then he played for Raja CA and Saudi club Damac FC, before joining RS Berkane in January 2020. From 2021 to 2022, he played for Difaâ El Jadida. On 31 July 2022, he returned to Raja CA.

International career
In January 2014, coach Hassan Benabicha, invited him to be a part of the Moroccan squad for the 2014 African Nations Championship. He helped the team to top group B after drawing with Burkina Faso and Zimbabwe and defeating Uganda. The team was eliminated from the competition at the quarter final zone after losing to Nigeria.

International goals
Scores and results list Morocco's goal tally first.

Honours
Difaâ Hassani El Jadidi
Moroccan Throne Cup: 2013

Raja CA
Moroccan Throne Cup: 2017
CAF Confederation Cup: 2018
CAF Super Cup: 2019

RS Berkane
CAF Confederation Cup: 2020

Morocco
African Nations Championship: 2018, 2020

References

1990 births
Living people
Moroccan footballers
Moroccan expatriate footballers
Morocco international footballers
Saudi Professional League players
Botola players
Difaâ Hassani El Jadidi players
Raja CA players
Damac FC players
RS Berkane players
Morocco A' international footballers
2014 African Nations Championship players
Association football forwards
Expatriate footballers in Saudi Arabia
Moroccan expatriate sportspeople in Saudi Arabia
2016 African Nations Championship players
2018 African Nations Championship players
2020 African Nations Championship players